Gel Mahalleh (also Romanized as Gel Maḩalleh) is a village in Chapakrud Rural District, Gil Khuran District, Juybar County, Mazandaran Province, Iran. At the 2006 census, its population was 1,135, in 276 families.

References 

Populated places in Juybar County